The 1949 Penn Quakers football team was an American football team that represented the University of Pennsylvania as an independent during the 1949 college football season. In its 12th season under head coach George Munger, the team compiled a 4–4 record and outscored opponents by a total of 159 to 118. The team won its first four games and was ranked No. 9 in the AP Poll before losing its last four games and dropping out of the AP Poll. The team played its home games at Franklin Field in Philadelphia.

Schedule

References

Penn
Penn Quakers football seasons
Penn Quakers football